Scannella is a surname. Notable people with the surname include:

Joe Scannella (1928–2018), American football player and coach of American and Canadian football
Mickaël Scannella (born 1987), French footballer